Vinícius Aparecido Pereira de Santana Campos (born 3 November 1983), known as Fininho, is a Brazilian football coach and a former defender. He is the manager of the Under-20 squad of Oeste.

Club career
In 2010, Fininho signed with Metalist Kharkiv in Ukraine.

Playing style
He had a trademark left-foot and was a specialist at long-shots, set-pieces and dribbles.

Honours
Corinthians

 Campeonato Brasileiro: 2005

Figueirense

 Campeonato Catarinense: 2006

Lokomotiv Moscow

 Russian Cup: 2006–07

References

External links
 

1983 births
Footballers from São Paulo
Living people
Brazilian footballers
Association football defenders
Sport Club Corinthians Paulista players
Esporte Clube Vitória players
Esporte Clube Juventude players
Figueirense FC players
FC Lokomotiv Moscow players
Sport Club do Recife players
FC Metalist Kharkiv players
Goiás Esporte Clube players
Madureira Esporte Clube players
Campeonato Brasileiro Série A players
Russian Premier League players
Ukrainian Premier League players
Brazilian expatriate footballers
Expatriate footballers in Russia
Brazilian expatriate sportspeople in Russia
Expatriate footballers in Ukraine
Brazilian expatriate sportspeople in Ukraine
Brazilian football managers